Dumai-Malacca Cable System or DMCS is a submarine telecommunications cable system linking Indonesia and Malaysia across the Strait of Malacca

It has landing points in:
Dumai, Riau Province, Indonesia
Melaka City, Malacca, Malaysia

It has a design transmission capacity of 320 Gbit/s of which 20 Gbit/s were lit at inception, and a total cable length of 150 km.  It was inaugurated on 17 February 2005.

References

 
 

Submarine communications cables in the Indian Ocean
Indonesia–Malaysia relations
2005 establishments in Indonesia
2005 establishments in Malaysia